The 2006 NCAA Division I women's soccer tournament (also known as the 2006 Women's College Cup) was the 25th annual single-elimination tournament to determine the national champion of NCAA Division I women's collegiate soccer. The semifinals and championship game were played at SAS Soccer Park in Cary, North Carolina from December 1–3, 2006 while the preceding rounds were played at various sites across the country from November 8–25.

North Carolina defeated Notre Dame in the final, 2–1, to win their eighteenth national title. This was a rematch of the 1994, 1996, and 1999 tournament finals, all won by the Tar Heels.

The most outstanding defensive player was Robyn Gayle from North Carolina, and the most outstanding offensive player was Heather O'Reilly, also from North Carolina. Gayle and O'Reilly, alongside nine other players, were named to the All-Tournament team.

The tournament's leading scorer, with 4 goals and 8 assists, was Kerri Hanks from Notre Dame.

Qualification

All Division I women's soccer programs were eligible to qualify for the tournament. The tournament field remained fixed at 64 teams.

Pre-Tournament Top 25 

1. Notre Dame
2. North Carolina
3. Santa Clara
4. UCLA
5. Florida State

6. Texas 
7. Portland 
8. Texas A&M
9. Penn State
10. West Virginia

11. Oklahoma State
12. Wake Forest
13. Utah
14. Florida
15. Rutgers

16. Stanford
17. BYU
18. Villanova
19. Navy
20. Colorado

21. California
22. Illinois
23. Tennessee
24. 
25. William & Mary

Records

Format
Just as before, the final two rounds, deemed the Women's College Cup, were played at a pre-determined neutral site. All other rounds were played on campus sites at the home field of the higher-seeded team. The only exceptions were the first two rounds, which were played at regional campus sites. The top sixteen teams hosted four team-regionals on their home fields (with some exceptions, noted below) during the tournament's first weekend.

Bracket

North Carolina Bracket

Texas Bracket

Santa Clara Bracket

Notre Dame Bracket

College Cup

All-tournament team
Robyn Gayle, North Carolina (most outstanding defensive player)
Heather O'Reilly, North Carolina (most outstanding offensive player)
Kelly Rowland, Florida State
India Trotter, Florida State
Brittany Bock, Notre Dame
Kerri Hanks, Notre Dame
Jill Krivacek, Notre Dame
Yael Averbuch, North Carolina
Tobin Heath, North Carolina
Casey Nogueira, North Carolina
Kristi Eveland, North Carolina

See also 
 NCAA Women's Soccer Championships (Division II, Division III)
 NCAA Men's Soccer Championships (Division I, Division II, Division III)

References

NCAA
NCAA Women's Soccer Championship
NCAA Division I Women's Soccer Tournament
NCAA Division I Women's Soccer Tournament
NCAA Division I Women's Soccer Tournament